"Funeral Oration" is a speech by Lysias, one of the "Canon of Ten" Attic orators (Speech 2 in  Lamb's translation).

Sources
Carey, Christopher. Trials from Classical Athens. New York: Routledge, 1997.
Todd, S.C. Lysias (The Oratory of Classical Greece). Austin: University of Texas Press, 2000.
Lamb, W.R.M. Lysias (Loeb Classical Library No. 244). Cambridge: Harvard University Press, 1930.

External links
 Funeral oration at the Perseus Project

Ancient Greek orations
Funeral orations